JPCC may refer to:
Jyllands-Posten Muhammad cartoons controversy
Journal of Physical Chemistry C